Tarni Evans is an Australian rules footballer playing for the Greater Western Sydney Giants in the AFL Women's league. Evans was recruited by the Giants with the 9th pick in the 2020 AFL Women's draft.

Early football
Evans played junior football for the Tathra Eaglettes and later the Queanbeyan Football Club. She spent two seasons in the AFLW Academy.

AFLW career
On debut, Evans collected 9 disposals, 2 marks and a tackle.

Statistics
Statistics are correct to the end of the 2021 season.

|- style="background-color: #eaeaea"
! scope="row" style="text-align:center" | 2021
|style="text-align:center;"|
| 18 || 7 || 0 || 0 || 40 || 20 || 60 || 11 || 12 || 0.0 || 0.0 || 5.7 || 2.9 || 8.6 || 1.6 || 1.7 || 0
|- 
|- class="sortbottom"
! colspan=3| Career
! 9
! 0
! 0
! 40
! 20
! 60
! 11
! 12
! 0.0
! 0.0
! 5.7
! 2.9 
! 8.6
! 1.6
! 1.7
! 0
|}

References

2002 births
Living people
Greater Western Sydney Giants (AFLW) players
Queanbeyan Football Club players
Australian rules footballers from New South Wales